Port au Port East is a town in the Canadian province of Newfoundland and Labrador, situated on the shore of Isthmus Bay. The town had a population of 413 in the Canada 2021 Census. The town consists of the unincorporated communities of Port au Port and Romaines.

Demographics 

See also
 List of cities and towns in Newfoundland and Labrador

References

Towns in Newfoundland and Labrador